Milan Nikolić may refer to:
 Milan Nikolić (footballer born 1983), Serbian football player currently playing in Kazakhstan
 Milan Nikolić (footballer, born 1987), Serbian football player currently playing for FK Moravac Orion Mrštane
 Milan Nikolić (musician) (born 1979), Serbian accordionist
 Milan Nikolić (ban) (1877–1943), Serbian brigadier general and ban (governor) of Danube Banovina
 Milan Nikolić (Serbian Radical Party politician) (born 1954), member of the National Assembly of Serbia (2008–12)